The third record label to use the name Bell Records was based in Honolulu, Hawaii, in the 1950s and 1960s. The label specialized in Hawaiian music. Recordings were made by Bill Fredlund.

See also
 List of record labels
 Bell Records

References

American record labels